The Municipality of Vojnik is a municipality in eastern Slovenia. The seat of the municipality is the town of Vojnik. The area is part of the traditional region of Styria. The municipality is now included in the Savinja Statistical Region.

Settlements
In addition to the municipal seat of Vojnik, the municipality also includes the following settlements:

 Arclin
 Beli Potok pri Frankolovem
 Bezenškovo Bukovje
 Bezovica
 Bovše
 Brdce
 Čreškova
 Črešnjevec
 Črešnjice
 Dedni Vrh pri Vojniku
 Dol pod Gojko
 Frankolovo
 Gabrovec pri Dramljah
 Globoče
 Gradišče pri Vojniku
 Homec
 Hrastnik
 Hrenova
 Ilovca
 Ivenca
 Jankova
 Kladnart
 Koblek
 Konjsko
 Landek
 Lemberg pri Novi Cerkvi
 Lešje
 Lindek
 Lipa pri Frankolovem
 Male Dole
 Nova Cerkev
 Novake
 Podgorje pod Čerinom
 Polže
 Pristava
 Rakova Steza
 Razdelj
 Razgor
 Razgorce
 Rove
 Selce
 Socka
 Straža pri Dolu
 Straža pri Novi Cerkvi
 Stražica
 Tomaž nad Vojnikom
 Trnovlje pri Socki
 Velika Raven
 Verpete
 Vine
 Vizore
 Višnja Vas
 Zabukovje
 Želče
 Zlateče

References

External links
 
 Municipality of Vojnik on Geopedia
 Vojnik municipal site

Vojnik